Girl Next Door is the second album by American pop rock group Saving Jane. The album was originally released on October 11, 2005 through Madacy Entertainment. On April 11, 2006, the album was remastered with a louder & rockier sound and re-released through Universal Records. the title track went on to sell over 100,000 copies and became the most successful single for the group.

Track listing

Original Version
"Girl Next Door"
"Happy"
"Who's Cryin' Now?"
"Autumn & Me"
"Change You"
"Reasons Why"
"Come Down to Me"
"Don't Stop"
"Imperfection"

Artist Choice Version
Girl Next Door
Who's Cryin' Now
The Pretender (Cover. Original by Jackson Browne)
Grace (Bonus Track)
Imperfection
Happy
Don't Stop
Come Down to Me
Ordinary
Reasons Why
Sleep On It
Mary
Autumn & Me 
You Say (Acoustic)
Girl Next Door (CBus Artist Choice Version) (Bonus Track)
Girl Next Door (Organic Artist Choice Version) (Bonus Track)

Re-release Version
"Who's Cryin' Now?"
"Happy"
"Girl Next Door"
"Imperfection"
"Reasons Why"
"Ordinary"
"Sleep On It"
"Don't Stop"
"The Pretender"
"Mary"
"Come Down to Me"
"Autumn & Me"
"You Say" (hidden track)
"Girl Next Door" (Acoustic) (iTunes Bonus Track)

Charts

References

2005 debut albums
Saving Jane albums
Madacy Entertainment albums
Universal Records albums